Mohammadabad (also Romanized as Moḩammadābād, Mohemmābād and Muhammadābād) is a city in the Jarqavieh Sofla District (Lower Jarqavieh District), in Isfahan County, Isfahan Province, Iran. At the 2006 census, its population was 4,391, in 1,093 families.

References

Populated places in Isfahan County

Cities in Isfahan Province